Grancona is a frazione of Val Liona in the province of Vicenza, Veneto, Italy since 2017.

Sports

Boca Ascesa Val Liona
Boca Ascesa Val Liona is an Italian association football club, based in this city. It currently plays in Eccellenza.

Its colors are black and green.

References

(Google Maps)

Cities and towns in Veneto
Val Liona